Mundikota railway station serves Mundikota and surrounding villages in Bhandara District and Gondia district in Maharashtra, India.

Electrification
The entire main line is electrified. The Gondia–Bhandara Road section was electrified in 1990–91. and Mundikota is lying between Bhandara Road–Gondia section of electrification.

References

Railway stations in Gondia district
Nagpur SEC railway division